Skårasalen is a mountain in the municipality of Ørsta in Møre og Romsdal county, Norway. The nearby mountain, Jakta, lies directly to the east on the opposite side of the fjord.

Skårasalen lies within the Sunnmørsalpene mountain range along the southern shores of the Hjørundfjorden. Access is easiest from the Kvistad valley on the western side.  An alternative descent for skiing is a steep route straight down to the fjord on the eastern side, and then to return via a hired boat.

See also
List of mountains of Norway

References

Mountains of Møre og Romsdal
Ørsta